Maulvi Said Muhammad, better known as Maulvi Omar or Maulvi Umar, is a senior Taliban commander who was captured by the Pakistani security forces in August 2009. Omar, a spokesman for the Tehrik-e-Taliban Pakistan (TTP), was a close associate of Baitullah Mehsud. His capture was seen as a major blow to the Taliban in Pakistan.

Omar, a high-profile figure who often contacted journalists to claim responsibility for the various actions of the Taliban, was captured while travelling with two associates in the Mohmand Agency of Pakistan's tribal areas, near the border with Afghanistan. In 2008 the Pakistan Government erroneously claimed he was killed in the bombing of Bajaur Agency. Describing his arrest, Maj Fazal Ur Rehman of the Pakistan army said "A very, very important militant has been arrested".

The arrest of Omar, who was reportedly captured due to the help of local anti-Taliban militia, was seen as important in weakening the Taliban who were already in some disarray following the death of Baitullah Mehsud. Omar was also seen as a key source of information on the operation of militants in the border areas with Afghanistan.

Following his arrest, Omar confirmed the death of his former chief Baitullah Mehsud; prior to his capture he had claimed that Mehsud was still alive.

References

External links
  Former Taliban spokesman caught in Mohmand

Living people
Pashtun people
Tehrik-i-Taliban Pakistan members
Tehrik-i-Taliban Pakistan
Taliban spokespersons
Year of birth missing (living people)